David Roger Watkins (born March 15, 1944) is an American retired physician and former professional baseball player. After his seven-year professional baseball career, Watkins matriculated from Kentucky Wesleyan College with a Bachelor's degree in biology in 1972, then earned his medical degree from the University of Louisville School of Medicine in 1976. Based in Louisville, Watkins is a former medical director of the Prauer Rehabilitation and Neuroscience Institute, partner with Rehab Associates PSC, and physician advisor at Jewish Hospital. He was a board member of the U.S. Marine Hospital Foundation, the Greater Louisville Medical Society, and the trustees of the Kentucky Medical Association Political Action Committee. In 2009, he received the Greater Louisville Medical Society's Excellence in Citizenship Award.

Watkins' baseball career began in 1963 when he was signed by the Detroit Tigers. He was selected by the Phillies in December 1963 in the annual first-year player draft then in force, and worked his way through the club's farm system for the next five seasons. In , he made the MLB Phillies' roster and spent the season as the team's backup catcher to regular Mike Ryan. In 69 games, including 33 as starting catcher, Watkins had 26 hits in 148 at-bats for a .176 batting average. He collected two doubles, a triple and four home runs.

The 1969 campaign was Watkins' last in baseball before he began his education and career in medicine.

References

External links

1944 births
Living people
American physicians
Bakersfield Bears players
Baseball players from Kentucky
Chattanooga Lookouts players
Jamestown Tigers players
Macon Peaches players
Major League Baseball catchers
Philadelphia Phillies players
Physicians from Louisville, Kentucky
Reading Phillies players
San Diego Padres (minor league) players
Sportspeople from Owensboro, Kentucky